Nicholas Alan Watney (born April 25, 1981) is an American professional golfer who plays on the PGA Tour. The highlight of Watney's career is his victory at the 2011 WGC-Cadillac Championship. In July 2011, Watney won the AT&T National and broke into the top ten of the Official World Golf Ranking for the first time.

Early career
Watney was born in Sacramento, California. He played his high school golf at Davis Senior High School in Davis, California. He played collegiate golf under his uncle Mike Watney at Fresno State University, where he was a three-time All-America golfer. Mike did not offer his nephew a scholarship to Fresno State; Nick had to walk on to the team. He turned professional in 2003, following in the footsteps of his uncle, who played on the PGA Tour in the 1970s.

Professional career
In 2003, Watney's first professional victory came at the Lewis Chitengwa Memorial on the Canadian Tour. The next year he played on the Nationwide Tour, and after winning the season-ending Nationwide Tour Championship, Watney earned qualification for the PGA Tour.

In 2007, Watney won his first PGA Tour title at the Zurich Classic of New Orleans. This victory took Watney into the top 100 of the Official World Golf Ranking for the first time. He got his second tour win at the 2009 Buick Invitational at Torrey Pines Golf Course in San Diego, with a one-stroke victory over John Rollins, taking him to his highest position yet in the World Golf Rankings, number 76.

In the 2010 PGA Championship at Whistling Straits, Watney had a three-shot lead going into the final round. However, he shot a final round of 81, which dropped him back to a tie for 18th place.

Watney won the biggest tournament of his career to date and his first World Golf Championship at the WGC-Cadillac Championship at Doral Golf Resort & Spa in March 2011. He entered the final round trailing by two strokes, but shot a final round 67, including a run of four birdies in five holes in the middle of the round, and finished with a birdie at the notoriously difficult 18th, to record a two-stroke victory over compatriot Dustin Johnson. Watney admitted in an interview afterwards that he had dwelt on finishing 2nd at Doral, in the same tournament two years before, when his putt on the 18th finished a couple of inches short of the hole. After the victory, Watney moved up to number 15 in the World Golf Rankings.

In July, Watney won for the second time in 2011 at the AT&T National by beating K. J. Choi by two strokes. The victory owed much to his third-round score when he set a course record 62 around Aronimink Golf Club, beating the previous record set coincidentally on the same day, which Chris Kirk and Steve Marino held briefly with joint 63s. Watney shot a 27 on the back nine, which tied the second lowest nine-hole score ever recorded on the PGA Tour. The record is held by Corey Pavin who shot 26 at the U.S. Bank Championship in Milwaukee in 2006. During the final round Watney did not record a single bogey, making a number of crucial par saving putts to hold off the challenge of Choi and capture his fourth PGA Tour title. This win took Watney to the top of the FedEx Cup standings, ahead of Choi, and into the top ten of the Official World Golf Ranking for the first time in his career. He finished the 2011 season ranked third on the PGA Tour money list.

During the 2011 President's Cup, he defeated K. J. Choi on the final day to give the United States team a distinct advantage over the International Team coached by Greg Norman. The four-day match play tournament was played in Melbourne, Australia, and it was won by the American team 19–15.

During the first round of the 2012 U.S. Open at the Olympic Club, Watney made a double eagle on the par-five 17th hole to become only the third man to record a double eagle in U.S. Open history, the others being Chen Tze-chung in 1985 at Oakland Hills and Shaun Micheel in 2010 at Pebble Beach.

In August 2012, Watney won the first of the four FedEx Cup playoff events, The Barclays, at Bethpage Black in New York. He came from two behind in the final round to win by three strokes over Brandt Snedeker to take the outright lead in the FedEx Cup standings. After Rory McIlroy won the second playoff event, Watney dropped to second in the standings and wound up in fourth place at the conclusion of the FedEx Cup playoffs. For the season, Watney finished in 22nd on the PGA Tour's money list.

In October 2012, after the PGA Tour season ended, Watney won the Malaysian CIMB Classic, an event on the Asian Tour (co-sponsored by the PGA Tour), with a final round, course-record 61.

In 2013, Watney finished second at the BMW Championship, fourth at the Farmers Insurance Open, ninth at The Barclays and tenth at the Shriners Hospitals for Children Open and the Wells Fargo Championship. For the season, Watney finished 24th on the PGA Tour's money list.

In 2014, Watney finished fifth at the Wyndham Championship and eighth at the Barracuda Championship. With only two top-10s and five top-25s, Watney dropped to 106th on the PGA Tour's money list.

In 2015, Watney finished second at the AT&T Pebble Beach National Pro-Am, seventh at the Farmers Insurance Open and tenth at the AT&T Byron Nelson. With three top-10s and eight top-25s, Watney rose to 55th on the PGA Tour's money list. Watney only played in five events the following season due to a herniated disc in his lower back. He played the 2016–17 season on a Major Medical Extension.

In 2018, Watney tied for second at the Wells Fargo Championship. Watney finished 88th on the PGA Tour's money list and finished 74th on the final FedEx Cup standings. He made 21 of 26 cuts.

On June 19, 2020, while playing in the RBC Heritage in Hilton Head, Watney became the first PGA Tour player to test positive for COVID-19.

Personal life
Watney's cousin is journalist Heidi Watney.

Professional wins (9)

PGA Tour wins (5)

Asian Tour wins (1)

1Co-sanctioned by the PGA Tour, but unofficial money event.

Nationwide Tour wins (1)

Canadian Tour wins (1)

Other wins (1)

Results in major championships

CUT = missed the half-way cut
"T" = tied

Summary

Most consecutive cuts made – 5 (2010 Masters – 2011 Masters)
Longest streak of top-10s – 1 (twice)

Results in The Players Championship

CUT = missed the halfway cut
"T" indicates a tie for a place
C = Canceled after the first round due to the COVID-19 pandemic

World Golf Championships

Wins (1)

Results timeline

QF, R16, R32, R64 = Round in which player lost in match play
"T" = tied
WD = withdrew
Note that the HSBC Champions did not become a WGC event until 2009.

U.S. national team appearances
Amateur
Palmer Cup: 2002 (winners)

Professional
World Cup: 2009
Presidents Cup: 2011 (winners)
Wendy's 3-Tour Challenge (representing PGA Tour): 2012 (winners)

See also
2004 Nationwide Tour graduates
2005 PGA Tour Qualifying School graduates

References

External links

American male golfers
Fresno State Bulldogs men's golfers
PGA Tour golfers
Korn Ferry Tour graduates
Golfers from Sacramento, California
Golfers from Nevada
People from Davis, California
Sportspeople from Fresno, California
People from Henderson, Nevada
Davis Senior High School (California) alumni
1981 births
Living people